The 2007 FIA European Truck Racing Championship was a multi-event motor racing championship for production based trucks held across Europe. The championship features a mix of professional motor racing teams and privately funded amateur drivers competing in highly modified versions of two-axle tractor units which conform to the technical regulations for the championship. It was the 23rd European Truck Racing Championship season and began at Catalunya on April 1, with the finale at Jarama on October 7 after nine events. The championship was won by Markus Bösiger, taking his first title.

Teams and drivers

Race drivers without fixed number, whose number is defined race by race:

Calendar and winners

Championship standings

Drivers' Championship

Each round or racing event consisted of four races, with two qualifying races and two cup races. For the two qualifying races, the points awarded according to the ranking was on a 10, 9, 8, 7, 6, 5, 4, 3, 2, 1 basis to the top 10 finishers – for the two cup races with the grid decided from the finishing order of the previous qualifying race, the points awarded were 20, 15, 12, 10, 8, 6, 4, 3, 2, 1  (rank 1 - 10) respectively.

Source of information:

Teams' Championship

Source of information:

References

External links 

Truck Race Organization
TruckRacing.de 

European Truck Racing Championship seasons
European Truck Racing Championship
Truck Racing Championship